The Defending Elections from Threats by Establishing Redlines Act, known by the acronym DETER, aims to impose sanctions, including new blocking and secondary sanctions, on foreign (primarily, Russian) governments and persons that interfere in any U.S. federal election.

History of Bills

See also
 Countering America's Adversaries Through Sanctions Act (CAATSA)
 Defending American Security from Kremlin Aggression Act (DASKA)

References

Proposed legislation of the 115th United States Congress
Proposed legislation of the 116th United States Congress
Sanctions legislation
Russian interference in the 2016 United States elections
Russia–United States relations
United States sanctions